Lancine Touré (born 21 January 1995) is an Ivorian professional footballer, who plays for Bangladesh Police FC in the Bangladesh premier League as a defender.

Career
Touré started his career with AS GNN of Niger Premier League.

In 2015, he moved to India, after believing the words of an agent who had promised to land him a lucrative contract with a professional club. However, the window for player signing was closed by then, and Touré was forced to make a decision whether to stay back in India or return. Thus, Touré came to Malappuram, the hub of Sevens football in Kerala, where African talents are major crowd-pullers and treated like gold dust.

The rigorous schedule of the Sevens world was a learning experience for Touré. While Sevens was profitable, Touré was aware of the risks that came with it. Luckily for Touré, he got through selection trials by Kolkata club Mohammedan Sporting Club and left Kerala just one month after coming here. He represented Sporting in the Calcutta Football League.

He was one of the three foreigners signed by Mohammedan Sporting Club for the 2015–16 I-League 2nd Division.

In 2016–17 I-League 2nd Division, he played for Mohammedan in the preliminary round. However, the club failed to qualify for the final stage. In April 2017, he joined Lonestar Kashmir F.C. and played in the 2016–17 I-League 2nd Division Final Round.

In March 2018, he joined Langsning FC and played in the 2017–18 I-League 2nd Division.

In June 2018, he returned to Mohammedan for the 2018–19 Calcutta Premier Division. During the season, Touré has attracted interest from the reigning I-League champions, Minerva Punjab.

Minerva Punjab
On 27 October 2018, Minerva Punjab signed Touré as a replacement for Aimable Nsabimana. He made his debut for the club in a 0–0 home draw against Churchill Brothers. He scored a brace against Aizawl FC and led Minerva to their first win of the season.

Brothers Union
In May 2019 Touré joined Brothers Union of Bangladesh Premier League as a mid term transfer window signing.

Personal life
Touré is a very religious person and a practising Muslim.

Career statistics

Club

Notes

References

1995 births
Living people
Ivorian footballers
Ivorian expatriate footballers
Association football defenders
RoundGlass Punjab FC players
I-League 2nd Division players
I-League players
Ivorian expatriate sportspeople in India
Expatriate footballers in India